Underwater Demolition Teams (UDT), or frogmen, were amphibious units created by the United States Navy during World War II with specialized non-tactical missions. They were predecessors of the navy's current SEAL teams.

Their primary WWII function began with reconnaissance and underwater demolition of natural or man-made obstacles obstructing amphibious landings. Postwar they transitioned to scuba gear changing their capabilities.  With that they came to be considered more elite and tactical during the Korean and Vietnam Wars. UDTs were pioneers in underwater demolition, closed-circuit diving, combat swimming, and midget submarine (dry and wet submersible) operations. They later were tasked with ensuring recovery of space capsules and astronauts after splash down in the Mercury, Gemini and Apollo space flight programs. Commando training was added making them the forerunner to the United States Navy SEAL program that exists today.

In 1983, after additional SEAL training, the UDTs were re-designated as SEAL Teams or Swimmer Delivery Vehicle Teams (SDVTs). SDVTs have since been re-designated SEAL Delivery Vehicle Teams.

Early history 
The United States Navy studied the problems encountered by the disastrous Allied amphibious landings during the Gallipoli Campaign of World War I. This contributed to the development and experimentation of new landing techniques in the mid-1930s. In August 1941, landing trials were performed and one hazardous operation led to Army Second Lieutenant Lloyd E. Peddicord being assigned the task of analyzing the need for a human intelligence (HUMINT) capability.

When the U.S. entered World War II, the Navy realized that in order to strike at the Axis powers the U.S. forces would need to perform a large number of amphibious attacks. The Navy decided that men would have to go in to reconnoiter the landing beaches, locate obstacles and defenses, as well as guide the landing forces ashore. In August 1942, Peddicord set up a recon school for his new unit, Navy Scouts and Raiders, at the amphibious training base at Little Creek, Virginia.

In 1942, the Army and Navy jointly established the Amphibious Scout and Raider School at Fort Pierce, Florida. Here Lieutenant Commander Phil H. Bucklew, the "Father of Naval Special Warfare", helped organize and train what became the Navy's 'first group' to specialize in amphibious raids and tactics.

The need for intelligence gathering prior to landings became paramount following the amphibious assault at the Battle of Tarawa in November 1943. Although Navy and Marine Corps planners had identified coral as an issue, they incorrectly assumed landing craft would be able to crawl over the coral. Marines were forced to exit their craft in chest deep water a thousand yards from shore, with many men drowning due to the irregularities of the reefs and  Japanese gunners inflicting heavy U.S. casualties.

After that experience, Rear admiral Kelley Turner, Commander of the V Amphibious Corps (VAC), directed Seabee Lt. Crist (CEC) to come up with a means to deal with the coral and the men to do it.  Lt. Crist staged  30 officers and 150 enlisted men from the 7th Naval Construction Regiment at Waipio Amphibious Operating Base on Oahu to form the nucleus of a reconnaissance and demolition training program. It is here that the UDTs of the Pacific were born.

Later in war, the Army Engineers passed down demolition jobs to the U.S. Navy. It then became the Navy's responsibility to clear any obstacles and defenses in the near shore area.

A memorial to the founding of the UDT has been built at Bellows Air Force Station near the original Amphibious Training Base (ATB) in Oahu.

Naval Combat Demolition Units

In early May 1943, a two-phase "Naval Demolition Project" was ordered by the Chief of Naval Operations (CNO) "to meet a present and urgent requirement". The first phase began at Amphibious Training Base (ATB) Solomons, Maryland with the establishment of Operational Naval Demolition Unit No. 1. Six Officers and eighteen enlisted men reported from the Seabees dynamiting and demolition school at Camp Peary for a four-week course. Those Seabees were immediately sent to participate in the invasion of Sicily where they were divided in three groups that landed on the beaches near Licata, Gela and Scoglitti.

Also in May, the Navy created a Naval Combat Demolition Units (NCDUs) tasked with eliminating beach obstructions in advance of amphibious assaults, going ashore in an LCRS inflatable boat. Each NCDU consisted of five enlisted men led by a single, junior (CEC) officer. In early May, Chief of Naval Operations Admiral Ernest J. King, picked Lieutenant Commander Draper L. Kauffman to lead the training. The first six classes graduated from "Area E" at the Seabee's Camp Peary between May and mid-July. Training was moved to Fort Pierce, Florida, where the first class began mid-July 1943. Despite the move and having the Scouts Raiders base close by, Camp Peary was Kauffman's primary source of recruits. "He would go up to Camp Peary's Dynamite School and assemble the Seabees in the auditorium saying: "I need volunteers for hazardous, prolonged and distant duty." Kauffman's other volunteers came from the U.S. Marines, and U.S. Army combat engineers. Training commenced with one grueling week designed to "separate the men from the boys". Some said that "the men had sense enough to quit, leaving Kauffman with the boys." It was and is still considered the first "Hell Week".

Normandy 
In early November 1943 NCDU-11 was assigned as the advance NCDU party for Operation Overlord. They would be joined in England by 33 more NCDUs. They trained with the 146th, 277th and 299th Combat Engineers to prepare for the landing. Each Unit had five Combat engineers attached to it. The first 10 NCDUs divided into three groups. The senior officer, by rank, was the commanding officer of Group III, Lieutenant Smith (CEC). He assumed command in an unofficial capacity. His Group III worked on experimental demolitions and developed the Hagensen Pack.(an innovation that used  of tetryl placed into rubber tubes that could be twisted around obstacles) As more teams arrived a NCDU Command was created for NCDUs: 11, 22–30, 41–46, 127–8, 130–42

 

The Germans had constructed elaborate defenses on the French coast. These included steel posts driven into the beach and topped with explosive charges. Large 3-ton steel barricades called Belgian Gates and hedgehogs were placed throughout the tidal zone. Behind which was a network of reinforced: coastal artillery, mortar and machine gun positions.

The Scouts and Raiders spent weeks gathering information during nightly surveillance missions up and down the French coast. Replicas of the Belgian Gates were constructed on the south coast of England for the NCDUs to practice demolitions on. It was possible to blow a gate to pieces, but that only created a mass of tangled iron creating more of an obstacle. The NCDUs found that the best method was to blast the structural joints of a gate so that it fell down flat.

The NCDU teams (designated Demolitions Gap-Assault teams) would come in at low tide to clear the obstacles.
Unfortunately, the plans were not executed as laid out. The preparatory air and naval bombardment was ineffective, leaving many German guns to fire on the assault. Also, tidal conditions caused difficulties for the NCDUs. Despite heavy German fire and casualties, the NCDUs charges opened gaps in the defenses.

As the infantry came ashore, some
used obstacles for cover that had demolition charges on them. The greatest difficulty was on Omaha Beach. By nightfall thirteen of the planned sixteen gaps were open. Of the 175 NCDU men that landed, 31 were killed and 60 were wounded. The attack on Utah Beach was better, four dead and eleven wounded. Overall, NCDUs suffered a 53 percent casualty rate. NCDUs were also assigned to Operation Dragoon, the invasion of southern France, with a few units from Normandy participating there too.

With Europe invaded Admiral Turner requisitioned all available NCDUs from Fort Pierce for integration into the UDTs for the Pacific. However, the first NCDUs, 1–10, had been staged at Turner City, Florida Island in the Solomon Islands during January 1944. A few were temporarily attached to UDTs. Later NCDUs 1–10 were combined to form Underwater Demolition Team Able. This team was disbanded with NCDUs 2 and 3, plus three others assigned to MacArthur's 7th Amphibious force, and were the only NCDUs remaining at war's end. The other men from Team Able were assigned to numbered UDTs.

Underwater Demolition Teams During WWII 
The first units designated as Underwater Demolition Teams were formed in the Pacific Theater.  Rear Admiral Turner, the Navy's amphibious expert, ordered the formation of  Underwater Demolition Teams in response to the assault debacle experienced at Tarawa. Turner recognized that amphibious operations required intelligence of underwater obstacles.   The personnel in teams 1-15 were primarily Seabees that had started out in the NCDUs.  UDT training was at the Waipio Amphibious Operating Base, under V Amphibious Corps operational and administrative control. Most of the instructors and trainees were graduates of the Fort Pierce NCDU or Scouts and Raiders schools, Seabees, Marines, and Army soldiers.

When Teams 1 and 2 were formed they were "provisional" and trained by a  Marine Corps Amphibious Reconnaissance Battalion that had nothing to do with the Fort Pierce program.  After a successful mission at Kwajalein, where 2 UDT men stripped down to swim trunks and effectively gathered the intelligence Admiral Turner desired.  As a result of their actions the  UDT mission model evolved to daylight reconnaissance, wearing swim trunks, fins, and masks. The immediate success of the UDTs made them an indispensable part of all future amphibious landings.

A UDT was organized with approximately sixteen officers and eighty enlisted. One Marine and one Army officer were liaisons within each team They were deployed in every major amphibious landing after Tarawa with 34 teams eventually being commissioned. Teams 1–21 were the teams that had deployed operationally, with slightly over half of the Officers and enlisted coming from the Seabees in those teams.  The remaining teams were not deployed due to the war ending.

Tarawa and the formation of UDTs 
Prior to Tarawa, both Naval and Marine Corps planners had identified coral as an issue for amphibious operations.   At Tarawa the neap tide created draft issues for the Higgins boats (LCVPs) clearing the reef.  The Amtracs carrying the first wave crossed the reef successfully. The LCVPs carrying the second wave ran aground, disembarking their Marines several hundred yards to shore in full combat gear, under heavy fire.  Many drowned or were killed before making the beach, forced to wade across treacherously uneven coral. The first wave was left fighting without reinforcements and took heavy casualties on the beach.

This disaster made it clear Admiral Turner that pre-assault intelligence was needed to avoid similar difficulties in future operations.  To that end, Turner ordered the formation of underwater demolition teams to do reconnaissance of beach conditions and do removal of submerged obstructions for Amphibious operations. After a thorough review, V Amphibious Corps found that the only people having any applicable experience with the coral were men in the Naval Construction Battalions. The Admiral tasked Lt. Thomas C. Crist (CEC) of CB 10 to develop a method for blasting coral under combat conditions and putting together a team for that purpose. Lt. Crist started by recruiting others he had blasted coral with in CB 10 and by the end November 1943 he had assembled close to 30 officers and 150 enlisted men from the 7th Naval Construction Regiment, at Waipio Amphibious Operating Base on Maui.

Kwajalein and the evolution of the UDT mission model

The first operation after Tarawa was Operation Flintlock in the Marshall Islands.  It began with the island of Kwajalein in January 1944.  Admiral Turner wanted the intelligence and to get it, the men that Lt. Crist had staged were used to form Underwater Demolition Teams: UDT 1 and UDT 2.  Initially, the team commanders were Cmdr. E. D. Brewster (CEC) and Lt. Crist (CEC).  However, Lt. Crist was made Ops officer of Team 2 and Lt. John T. Koehler was made the team Commander.  As with all Seabee military training the Marines provided it.  A Marine Corps Amphibious Reconnaissance Battalion oversaw five weeks further training of the Seabees in  UDTs 1 and 2 to prepare for the mission.   UDT 1 was tasked with two daylight recons.  The men were to follow Marine Corps Recon procedure with each two-man team getting close to the beach in a inflatable boats to make their observations wearing fatigues, boots, helmets, and life-lined to their boats. Team 1 found that the reef kept them from ascertaining conditions both in the water and on the beach as had been anticipated.  In keeping with the Seabee traditions of: (1) doing whatever it takes to accomplish the job and (2) not always following military rules to get it done, UDT 1 did both, the fatigues and boots came off.

Ensign Lewis F. Luehrs and Seabee Chief Bill Acheson had anticipated that they would not be able to get the intell Admiral Turner wanted following USMC Recon protocol and had worn swim trunks beneath their fatigues. Stripping down, they swam 45 minutes undetected across the reef returning with sketches of gun emplacements and other intelligence.  Still in their trunks, they were taken directly to Rear Admiral Turner's flagship to report. Afterwards, Rear Admiral Turner concluded that the only way to get this kind of information was to do what these men had done as individual swimmers, which is what he relayed to Admiral Nimitz. The planning and decisions of Rear Admiral Turner, Ensign Luehrs and Chief Acheson made Kwajalein a developmental day in UDT history, changing both the mission model and training regimen.  Luehrs would make rank and be in UDT 3 until he was made XO of UDT 18.  Acheson and three other UDT officers were posted to the 301st CB as blasting officers.  The 301st specialized in Harbor dredging. It saved UDT teams from blasting channels and Harbor clearance, but it required its own blasters.

Admiral Turner ordered the formation of nine teams, six for VAC and three for III Amphibious Corps.  Seabees made up the majority of the men in teams 1–9, 13 and 15. The officers of those teams were primarily CEC (Seabees).  UDT 2 was sent to Roi-Namur where Lt. Crist would earn a Silver Star.   UDTs 1 and 2 were decommissioned upon return to Hawaii with most the men transferred to UDTs 3, 4, 5, and 6.  Admiral Turner ordered the formation of nine teams, three for III Amphibious Corps and six for V Amphibious Corps(in all teams 3–11). As more NCDUs arrived in the Pacific they were used to form even more teams.  UDT 15 was an all NCDU team. In order to implement these changes and grow the UDTs, Koehler was made the commanding officer of the Naval Combat Demolition Training and Experimental Base on Maui. Admiral Turner also brought on LCDR Draper Kaufmann as a combat officer.

It became obvious more men were needed than the NCDUs would supply and Cmdr. Kauffman was no longer recruiting Seabees, so Admiral Nimitz put out a call to the Pacific Fleet for volunteers. They would form three teams; UDT 14 would be the first of them.  Recruiting was such an issue that three Lt. Cmdrs were transferred from USN Beach Battalions to command UDTs 11, 12, 13 that had no background in demolition.

Admiral Turner requested the establishment of the Naval Combat Demolition Training and Experimental Base at Kihei independent of Fort Pierce, expanding upon what had been learned from UDT 1 at Kwajalein. Operations began in February 1944 with Lt. Crist the first head of training. Most of the procedures from Fort Pierce were changed, replaced with an emphasis on developing swimmers, daylight reconnaissance, and no lifelines. The uniform of the day changed to diving masks, swim trunks, and a Ka-bar, creating the UDT image as "Naked Warriors" (swim-fins were added after UDT 10 introduced them).

Roi-Namur, Saipan, Tinian, and Guam 
At Saipan and Tinian UDTs 5, 6, and 7 were given the missions: day time for Saipan and night for Tinian.  At Saipan UDT 7 developed a method to recover swimmers on the move without making the recovery vessel a stationary target.

For Guam UDTs 3, 4, and 6 were the teams assigned.  When it was over the Seabee-dominated teams had made naval history. For the Marianas operations Admiral Turner recommended over sixty Silver Stars and over three hundred Bronze Stars with Vs for UDTs 3–7 That was unprecedented in U.S. Naval/Marine Corps history.

For UDTs 5 and 7, all officers received  silver stars and all the enlisted received bronze stars with Vs for Operation Forager (Tinian). For UDTs 3 and 4 all officers received a silver stars and all the enlisted received bronze stars with Vs for Operation Forager (Guam). Admiral Conolly felt the commanders of teams 3 and 4 (Lt. Crist and Lt. W.G. Carberry) should have received Navy Crosses.  Teams 4 & 7 also received Naval Unit Commendations.

Peleliu, Philippines, and Iwo Jima
UDTs 6, 7, and 10 drew the Peleliu assignment while UDT 8 went to Angaur. The officers were almost all CEC and the enlisted were Seabees.

At formation UDT 10 was assigned 5 officers and 24 enlisted that had trained as OSS Operational Swimmers.(Maritime Unit: Operational Swimmer Group II) They were led by a Lt. A.O. Chote Jr., who became UDT 10's commanding officer. The men were multi-service: Army, Coast Guard, Marine Corps and Navy. but, the OSS was not allowed to operate in the Pacific Theater.  Admiral Nimitz needed swimmers and did approve their transfer from the OSS to his operational and administrative control.  Most of their OSS gear was stored as it was not applicable to UDT work however, their swimfins came with them.  The other UDTs quickly adopted them.

UDT 14 was the first all-Navy team (one of three from the Pacific fleet) even though its CO and XO were CEC and some of Team Able was incorporated.   In the Philippines Leyte Gulf UDTs 10 & 15 reconnoitered beaches at Luzon, teams 3, 4, 5, & 8 were sent to Dulag and teams 6, 9, & 10 went to Tacloban.

When UDT 3 returned to Maui the team was made the instructors of the school. Lt Crist was again made Training Officer.  Under his direction training was broken into four 2-week blocks with an emphasis on swimming and reconnaissance. There were classes in night operations, unit control, coral and lava blasting in addition to bivouacking, small unit tactics and small arms. Lt Crist would be promoted to Lt Cmdr and the team would remain in Hawaii until April 1945. At that time the Seabees of UDT 3 were transferred to Fort Pierce to be the instructors there. In all they would train teams 12 to 22. Lt. Cmdr. Crist would be sent back to Hawaii.

D-minus 2 at Iwo Jima UDTs 12, 13, 14, and 15 reconnoitered the beaches from twelve LCI(G) with just one man wounded.  They did come under intense heavy fire that sank three of their LCI(G) with the others seriously damaged of disabled.  The LCI(G) crews suffered more than the UDTs with the skipper of one boat earning a Medal of Honor.  The next day a Japanese bomb hit UDT 15's APD,  killing fifteen and wounding 23. It was the largest loss suffered by the UDTs during the war.

On D-plus 2 the beachmaster requested help.  There were so many broached or damaged landing craft and the beach was so clogged with war debris that there was no place for landing craft to get ashore.  Lt Cmdr. E. Hochuli of UDT 12 volunteered his team to go deal with the problem and teams 13 and 14 were ordered to go with. Lt Cmdr. Vincent Moranz of UDT 13 was "reluctant, and radioed that his men ... were not salvage-men. It is reported that Capt. (Bull) Hanlon, Underwater Demolition Operations Commanding Officer radioed back that he did not want anything salvaged, he wanted that beach cleared." The difference in attitude between Hochuli and Moranz would be remembered in the unit awards.

The three teams worked for five days clearing the waters edge.  While the teams all did the same job under the same conditions the Navy gave them different unit awards: UDT 12 a PUC, UDT 14 a NUC and UDT 13 nothing.  The USMC ground commanders felt that every man that set foot on the island during the assault had an award coming. The Navy did not share this point of view, besides UDT 13 not a single USN beach party received a unit award either. On D-plus 2, when the UDTs set foot on beaches that were under a USMC assault, any unit award they received should have come under the USMC award protocol.  The USMC Iwo Jima PUC/NUC was a mass award with the PUC going to assault units and the NUC going to support units.

UDTs also served at Eniwetok, Ulithi, Leyte, Lingayen Gulf, Zambales, Labuan, and Brunei Bay. At Lingayen UDT 9 was aboard the  when she was hit by a Kamikaze. It cost the team one officer, 7 enlisted, 3 MIA and 13 wounded.

Okinawa to the end of the war

The largest UDT operation of WWII was the invasion of Okinawa, involving teams 7, 11, 12, 13, 14, 16, 17, and 18 (nearly 1,000 men). All prior missions had been in warm tropic waters but, the waters around Okinawa were cool enough that long immersion could cause hypothermia and severe cramps. Since thermal protection for swimmers was not available, UDTs were at risk to these hazards working around Okinawa.

Operations included both real reconnaissance and demolition at the landing beaches, and feints to create the illusion of landings in other locations. Pointed poles set into the coral reef protected the beaches on Okinawa. Teams 11 and 16 were sent in to blast the poles. The charges took out all of UDT 11's targets and half of UDT 16's. UDT 16 aborted the operation due to the death of one of their men; hence, their mission was considered a failure. UDT 11 went back the next day and took out the remaining poles after-which the team remained to guide landing-craft to the beach.

By war's end 34 teams had been formed with teams 1–21 having actually been deployed.  The Seabees provided half of the men in the teams that saw service.  The U.S. Navy did not publicize the existence of the UDTs until post war and when they did they gave credit to Lt. Commander Kauffman and the Seabees.

During WWII the Navy did not have a rating for the UDTs nor did they have an insignia.  Those men with the CB rating on their uniforms considered themselves Seabees that were doing underwater demolition.  They did not call themselves "UDTs" or "Frogmen" but rather "Demolitioneers" which had carried over from the NCDUs and LtCdr Kauffmans recruiting them from the Seabee dynamiting and demolition school.  UDTs had to meet the military's standard age guidelines, Seabees older could not volunteer.

In preparation for the invasion of Japan the UDTs created a cold water training center and mid-1945 UDTs had to meet a "new physical standard".  UDT 9 lost 70% of the team to this change.  The last UDT demolition operation of the war was on 4 July 1945 at Balikpapan, Borneo.  The UDTs continued to prepare for the invasion of Japan until VJ Day when the need for their services ceased.

With the draw-down from the war two half-strength UDTs were retained, one on each coast: UDT Baker and UDT Easy. However, the UDTs were the only special troops that avoided complete disbandment after the war, unlike the OSS Maritime Unit, the VAC Recon Battalion, and several Marine recon missions.

In 1942 the Seabees became a completely new branch of the United States War Department.  The Marine Corps provided both training and an organizational model.  Something that either was not shared or the Seabees chose to ignore or considered not important was the keeping of logs, journals and records.  The Seabees brought this record keeping approach with to the NCDUs and UDTs.

After World War II

Japan occupation

On 20 August 1945  embarked UDT 21 at Guam as a component of the U.S. occupation force heading for Japan. Nine days later UDT 21 became the first U.S military unit to set foot on Japanese home soil when it reconned the beaches at Futtsu-misaki Point in Tokyo Bay.   Their assessment was that the area was well suited for landing U.S. amphibious forces.  UDT 21 made a large sign to greet the Marines on the beach.  Team 21 was all fleet and the sign said greetings from "USN" UDT 21.  The next day Begor took UDT 21 to Yokosuka Naval Base. There the team cleared the docks for the first U.S. warship to dock in Japan, . The team remained in Tokyo Bay until 8 Sept when it was tasked with locating remaining Kamikaze and two-man submarines at Katsura Wan, Uchiura Wan at Suruga Bay, Sendai, Onohama Shipyards and Choshi. Orders arrived for Begor to return the team to San Diego on 27 September.

From 21 to 26 September UDT 11 was at Nagasaki and reported men getting sick from the stench.

China  
With the war over thousands of Japanese troops remained in China.   The issue was given to the Marine's III Marine Amphibious Corps.  UDT 9 was assigned to Operation Beleaguer to recon the landings of the 1st Marine Division at Taku and Tsingtao the first two weeks of October 1945. On their way to China the Navy had UDT 8 carry out a mission at Jinaen, Korea 8–27 September 1945. When UDT 9 arrived back in the States it was made one of the two post-War teams and redesignated UDT Baker.

UDT 8 was also sent to China and was at Taku, Chefoo, and Tsingtao.

Operation Crossroads
Bikini atoll was chosen for the site of the nuclear tests of Operation Crossroads."In March 1946, Project Y scientists from Los Alamos decided that the analysis of a sample of water from the immediate vicinity of the nuclear detonation was essential if the tests were to be properly evaluated. After consideration of several proposals to accomplish this, it was finally decided to employ drone boats of the type used by Naval Combat Demolition Units in France during the war".

UDT Easy, later named UDT 3, was given the designation TU 1.1.3 for the Operation and was assigned the control and maintenance of the drone boats. At Bikini the drones were controlled from the Begor. Once a water sample was taken the drone would return to the Begor to be hosed down for decontamination. After a Radiation Safety Officer had taken a Geiger counter reading and the OK given, the UDTs would board with a radiation chemist to retrieve the sample. Begor came to have the reputation as the most contaminated boat in the fleet.

A major issue afterwards was the treatment of the dislocated natives. In November 1948, the Bikinians were relocated to the uninhabited Island of Kili, however that island was located inside a coral reef that had no channel for access to the sea. In the spring of 1949, the governor of the Trust Territories, Marshall Group requested the U.S. Navy blast a channel to change this. That task was given to the Seabees on Kwajalin whose CO quickly determined this was actually a UDT project. He sent a request to CINCPACFLT who forwarded it to COMPHIBPAC. This ultimately resulted in the sending of UDT 3 on a Civic action program that turned out better than politicians could have hoped. The King of the Bikinians held a send off feast for the UDTs the night before they departed.

Submersible Operations
Post WWII the UDTs continued to research new techniques for underwater and shallow-water operations. One area was the use of SCUBA equipment. Dr. Chris Lambertsen had developed the Lambertsen Amphibious Respiratory Unit (LARU), an oxygen rebreather, which was used by the Maritime Unit of the OSS. In October 1943, he demonstrated it to LtCmdr. Kauffman, but was told the device was not applicable to current UDT operations. Dr. Lambertsen and the OSS continued to work on closed-circuit oxygen diving and combat swimming. When the OSS was dissolved in 1945, Lambertsen retained the LARU inventory. He later demonstrated the LARU to Army Engineers, the Coast Guard, and the UDTs. In 1947, he demonstrated the LARU to LtCmdr. Francis "Doug" Fane, then a senior UDT commander. 
LtCmdr. Fane was enthusiastic for new diving techniques. He pushed for the adoption of rebreathers and SCUBA gear for future operations, but the Navy Experimental Diving Unit and the Navy Dive School, which used the old "hard-hat" diving apparatus, declared the new equipment be too dangerous. Nonetheless, LtCmdr. Fane invited Dr. Lambertsen to NAB Little Creek, Virginia in January 1948 to demonstrate and train UDT personnel in SCUBA operations. This was the first-ever SCUBA training for USN divers. Following this training, Lcdr. LtCmdr. Fane then started the classified "Submersible Operations" or SUBOPS platoon with men drawn from UDT 2 and 4 under the direction of Lieutenant (junior grade) Bruce Dunning.

LtCmdr. Fane also brought the conventional "Aqua-lung" open-circuit SCUBA system into use by the UDTs. Open-circuit SCUBA is less useful to combat divers, as the exhausted air produces a tell-tale trail of bubbles. However, in the early 1950s, the UDTs decided they preferred open-circuit SCUBA, and converted entirely to it. The remaining stock of LARUs was supposedly destroyed in a beach-party bonfire. Later on, the UDT reverted to closed-circuit SCUBA, using improved rebreathers developed by Dr. Lambertsen.

It was at this time that the UDTs, led by LtCmdr. Fane, established training facilities at Saint Thomas in the Virgin Islands.

The UDTs also began developing weapons skills and procedures for commando operations on land in coastal regions. The UDTs started experiments with insertion/extraction by helicopter, jumping from a moving helicopter into the water or rappelling like mountain climbers to the ground. Experimentation developed a system for emergency extraction by plane called "Skyhook". Skyhook utilized a large helium balloon and cable rig with harness. A special grabbing device on the nose of a C-130 enabled a pilot to snatch the cable tethered to the balloon and lift a person off the ground. Once airborne, the crew would winch the cable in and retrieve the personnel though the back of the aircraft. Training this technique was discontinued following the death of a SEAL at NAB Coronado during a training exercise. Teams still utilize the Skyhook for equipment extraction and retain the combat capability for personnel if needed.

Korean War 
During the Korean War, the UDTs operated on the coasts of North Korea, with their efforts initially focused on demolitions and mine disposal. Additionally, the UDT accompanied South Korean commandos on raids in the North to demolish railroad tunnels and bridges. The higher-ranking officers of the UDT frowned upon this activity because it was a non-traditional use of the Naval forces, which took them too far from the water line. Due to the nature of the war, the UDT maintained a low operational profile. Some of the better-known missions include the transport of spies into North Korea, and the destruction of North Korean fishing nets.

A more traditional role for the UDT was in support of Operation CHROMITE, the amphibious landing at Inchon. UDT 1 and UDT 3 divers went in ahead of the landing craft, scouting mud flats, marking low points in the channel, clearing fouled propellers, and searching for mines. Four UDT personnel acted as wave-guides for the Marine landing.

The UDT assisted in clearing mines in Wonsan harbor, under fire from enemy shore batteries. Two minesweepers were sunk in these operations.

The Korean War was a period of transition for the men of the UDT. They tested their previous limits and defined new parameters for their special style of warfare. These new techniques and expanded horizons positioned the UDT well to assume an even broader role as war began brewing to the south in Vietnam.

NASA 

Initially, the splashdown of U.S. manned space capsules were unassisted. That changed quickly after the second manned flight; when Mercury 11 hit the water following reentry, the hatch blew and she sank, nearly drowning Gus Grissom.  All Mercury, Gemini, and Apollo space capsules were subsequently met by UDTs 11 or 12 upon splashdown.  Before the hatch was opened, the UDTs would attach a flotation collar to the capsule and liferaft for the astronauts to safely exit the craft.

Vietnam War 

The Navy entered the Vietnam War in 1958, when the UDTs delivered a small watercraft far up the Mekong River into Laos. In 1961, naval advisers started training South Vietnamese personnel in South Vietnam. The men were called the Liên Đoàn Người Nhái (LDNN) or Vietnamese Frogmen, which translates as "Frogmen Team".

UDT teams carried out hydrographic surveys in South Vietnam's coastal waters and reconnaissance missions of harbors, beaches and rivers often under hazardous conditions and enemy fire.

Later, the UDTs supported the Amphibious Ready Groups operating on South Vietnam's rivers. UDTs manned riverine patrol craft and went ashore to demolish obstacles and enemy bunkers. They operated throughout South Vietnam, from the Mekong Delta (Sea Float), the Parrot's Beak and French canal AO's through I Corps and the Song Cui Dai estuary south of Da Nang.

Birth of Navy SEALs 
In the mid-1950s, the Navy saw how the UDT's mission had expanded to a broad range of "unconventional warfare", but also that this clashed with the UDT's traditional focus on swimming and diving operations. It was therefore decided to create a new type of unit that would build on the UDT's elite qualities and water-borne expertise, but would add land combat skills, including parachute training and guerrilla/counterinsurgency operations. These new teams would come to be known as the US Navy SEALs, an acronym for Sea, Air, and Land. Initially there was a lag in the unit's creation until President John F. Kennedy took office. Kennedy recognized the need for unconventional warfare, and supported the use of special operations forces against guerrilla activity. The Navy moved forward to establish its new special operations force and in January 1962 commissioned SEAL Team ONE in NAB Coronado and SEAL Team TWO at NAB Little Creek. UDT-11 & 12 were still active on the west coast and UDT-21 & 22 on the east coast. The SEALs quickly earned a reputation for valor and stealth in Vietnam, where they conducted clandestine raids in perilous territory. In May 1983, the remaining UDT teams were reorganized as SEAL teams. UDT 11 became SEAL Team Five and UDT 12 became Seal Delivery Vehicle Team One. UDT 21 became SEAL Team Four and UDT 22 became Seal Delivery Vehicle Team Two. A new team, SEAL Team Three was established in October 1983.  Since then, teams of SEALs have taken on clandestine missions in war-torn regions around the world, tracking high-profile targets such as Panama's Manuel Noriega and Colombian drug lord Pablo Escobar, and playing integral roles in the wars in Iraq and Afghanistan.

Badge

For those who served in an Underwater Demolition Team, the U.S. Navy authorized the Underwater Demolition operator badge in 1970. However, the UDT badge was phased out in 1971, a few months after it appeared, as was the silver badge for enlisted UDT/SEAL frogmen. After that, SEAL and UDT operators, both officer and enlisted, all wore the same gold Trident, as well as gold Navy jump wings.

Unit awards 
The UDTs have received several unit citations and commendations. Members who participated in actions that merited the award are authorized to wear the medal or ribbon associated with the award on their uniform. Awards and decorations of the United States Armed Forces have different categories, (i.e. Service, Campaign, Unit, and Personal). Unit Citations are distinct from the other decorations.

Naval Combat Demolition Force O (Omaha beach) Normandy
  Presidential Unit Citation Normandy
Naval Combat Demolition Force U (Utah beach) : Normandy
  Navy Unit Commendation : Normandy

UDT 1
  Navy Unit Commendation : Korea

UDT 4 
  Navy Unit Commendation : Guam
  Navy Unit Commendation : Leyte
  Navy Unit Commendation : Okinawa

UDT 7
  Navy Unit Commendation : Marianas
  Navy Unit Commendation : Western Carolinas

UDT 11
  Presidential Unit Citation : Okinawa.
  Presidential Unit Citation : Bruni Bay, Borneo,
  Presidential Unit Citation : Balikpapan, Burneo,
  Navy Unit Commendation 1966
  Navy Meritorious Unit Commendation 1968
  Navy Unit Commendation 1969
  Presidential Unit Citation : 1969
  Navy Meritorious Unit Commendation 1969
  Navy Meritorious Unit Commendation 1969
  Navy Meritorious Unit Commendation 1970
 Republic of Vietnam Civil Actions Medal Unit Citation
 Republic of Vietnam Gallantry Cross with Palm Unit Award
 Coast Guard Meritorious Unit Commendation

UDT 12   
  Presidential Unit Citation : Iwo Jima, 
  Presidential Unit Citation : Okimawa
  Navy Unit Commendation 1966
  Navy Meritorious Unit Commendation Vietnam 1967
  Navy Meritorious Unit Commendation Vietnam 1967
  Navy Meritorious Unit Commendation Vietnam 1968
  Navy Meritorious Unit Commendation Vietnam 1968
  Navy Meritorious Unit Commendation Vietnam 1969
 Republic of Vietnam Gallantry Cross with Palm Unit Award
 Operation Eagle Pull
 Operation Frequent Wind
  Humanitarian Service Medal 1979 Boat People

UDT 13
  Navy Meritorious Unit Commendation Vietnam 1969
 Republic of Vietnam Gallantry Cross with Palm Unit Award 1970

UDT 14 
  Navy Unit Commendation : Luzon
  Navy Unit Commendation : Iwo Jima
  Navy Unit Commendation : Okinawa

UDT 21
 Navy Expeditionary Medal
  Navy Meritorious Unit Commendation Vietnam
  Navy Meritorious Unit Commendation Vietnam
  Navy Meritorious Unit Commendation Vietnam
  Navy Meritorious Unit Commendation Vietnam

UDT 22
  Navy Meritorious Unit Commendation Vietnam 1969
OPNAV NOTICE 1650, MASTER LIST OF UNIT AWARDS AND CAMPAIGN MEDALS

Fiction
 The Frogmen (1951), starring Dana Andrews and Richard Widmark. World War II film based on the Underwater Demolition Teams. Contemporary UDT members appear in several sequences.
 Underwater Warrior (1958) directed by Andrew Marton is based on the memoirs of Lieutenant-Commander Francis Douglas Fane, Naked Warriors.

See also

References

Further reading
 Best, Herbert. The Webfoot Warriors; The Story of UDT, the U.S. Navy's Underwater Demolition Team. New York: John Day Co, 1962. 
 Fane, Francis Douglas, and Don Moore. The Naked Warriors: The Story of the U.S. Navy's Frogmen. Annapolis, MD: Naval Institute Press, 1995.  
 O'Dell, James Douglas. The Water Is Never Cold: The Origins of the U.S. Navy's Combat Demolition Units, UDTs, and SEALs. Washington, DC: Brassey's, 2000.  
 Young, Darryl. SEALs, UDT, Frogmen: Men Under Pressure. New York: Ivy Books, 1994.  
Milligan, Benjamin H. By Water Beneath The Walls. New York: Bantam Books, 2021. ISBN 978-0-553-39219-7

External links
 Navy UDT-SEAL Museum
 NavyFrogMen.com U. S. Naval Special Warfare Archives
 Pritzker Military Museum & Library
 "TNT Divers" Popular Mechanics, November 1945, pp. 72–73, one of earliest articles on WW2 UDT units.

Military engineering
Armed forces diving
Special operations units and formations of the United States Navy
Frogman operations